Chris Chatterton is an English illustrator and animator from County Durham. He is the illustrator of children's picturebooks including Supermarket Gremlins, and Pete's Magic Pants. He was the animation director of two animated episodes of the Doctor Who story, The Ice Warriors, released on DVD in August 2013.

Life and career 
Chris Chatterton was born in 1982 in County Durham, England. Chatterton worked in graphic design before joining animation studio Qurios Entertainment. Chatterton worked on a wide variety of commercials and animated projects for TV, film and games including Hyperdrive, Bonkers, Spooks, Tracy Beaker Returns and The Dumping Ground. Qurios later merged with Dene Films, a Newcastle upon Tyne based live action production company where Chatterton was Production Manager until 2013.

In February 2013 it was announced that Chatterton would direct two animated episodes of the Doctor Who story, The Ice Warriors with long-time collaborators Niel Bushnell and Chris Chapman as co-producers.

In 2013, with the closure of both Qurios and Dene Films Chatterton began working as an illustrator for children's picturebooks. He is represented by the Bright Literary Agency.

Illustrated Works

Pete's Magic Pants
Pete's Magic Pants: The Lost Dinosaur (2016) written by Paddy Kempshall
Pete's Magic Pants: Pirate Peril (2017) written by Paddy Kempshall

Gremlins series
Supermarket Gremlins (2016) written by Adam and Charlotte Guillain
School Gremlins (2017) written by Adam and Charlotte Guillai
Christmas Gremlins (2018) written by Adam and Charlotte Guillai

Dino Diggers
Dino Diggers: Digger Disaster (2017) written by Rose Impey
Dino Diggers: Crane Calamity (2018) written by Rose Impey
Dino Diggers: Dumper Truck Danger (2018) written by Rose Impey

Ten Minutes to Bed
Ten Minutes to Bed: Little Unicorn (2018) written by Rhiannon Fielding
Ten Minutes to Bed: Little Monster (2019) written by Rhiannon Fielding
Ten Minutes to Bed: Little Mermaid (2019) written by Rhiannon Fielding
Ten Minutes to Bed: Little Unicorn's Christmas (2019) written by Rhiannon Fielding
Ten Minutes to Bed: Little Unicorn's Birthday (2020) written by Rhiannon Fielding

Arnold and Louise
The Great Louweezie - Arnold and Louise #1 (2019) written by Erica S Perl
Lost and Found - Arnold and Louise #2 (2019) written by Erica S Perl
Happy Fell - Arnold and Louise #3 (2019) written by Erica S Perl
All the Fun Winter Things - Arnold and Louise #4 (2019) written by Erica S Perl

A Math Tale
Crash! Boom! a Math Tale (2018) written by Robie H Harris
Now What? a Math Tale (2019) written by Robie H Harris

The Princess Rules
The Princess Rules (2020) written by Philippa Gregory
It’s a Prince Thing (2021) written by Philippa Gregory

Individual books
Kindergarten is Cool (2016) written by Linda Elovitz Marshall
There's a Bison Bouncing on the Bed! (2016) written by Paul Bright
When Santa Came to Stay (2016) written by Timothy Knapman
The Worrysaurus (2019) written by Rachel Bright (author)
The Hugasaurus (2021) written by Rachel Bright Rachel Bright (author)

Books as Author and Illustrator 
This is Gus (2019) 
Merry Christmas, Gus (2020)

References

External links

ChriChatterton.com Official site

Chris Chatterton at Amazon.co.uk

1982 births
British animated film directors
British illustrators
British television directors
English animators
English children's book illustrators
Living people